Lee Brown may refer to:

Lee Brown (footballer) (born 1990), English footballer, for Portsmouth FC
Lee P. Brown (born 1937), police department chief and mayor of Houston
Lee Bradley Brown (1971–2011), British tourist allegedly beaten to death by Dubai police
Lee Ann Brown (born 1963), American poet

See also
Leigh Brown (born 1982), Australian rules footballer
Brown (surname)